The Seven Foot Knoll Light was built in 1855 and is the oldest screw-pile lighthouse in Maryland. It was located atop Seven Foot Knoll in the Chesapeake Bay until it was replaced by a modern navigational aid and relocated to Baltimore's Inner Harbor as a museum exhibit.

Location 
It was initially installed on a rocky shoal called Seven Foot Knoll (at ), in the mouth of the Patapsco River. The northern tidal reach of this river is the Baltimore Harbor, where the now-decommissioned lighthouse has been placed as a museum exhibit. In 1997 the lighthouse was transferred to the Baltimore Maritime Museum (now the Historic Ships in Baltimore museum) and is permanently installed at the south end of Pier 5.

Construction 
Constructed of  rolled iron, the lighthouse consists of three main sections. The house was the second section, sitting directly atop the gallery deck. This is where the keeper and his family would live. Atop the housing area was the third section of the lighthouse, the light beacon. A 4th order Fresnel lens was housed in the small light compartment.

History 
The first requests for a light came in 1848, with initial appropriations in 1851. Delays in planning and bidding pushed the start of construction to 1854. The house consisted of a cylindrical structure of wrought iron plates, with the ninth pile in the center. Total construction costs came to $43,000 by its completion the following year. Most parts were fabricated in Baltimore at the Murray and Hazelhurst iron foundry. The parts were then shipped to Seven Foot Knoll by boat where they were assembled atop of the screw piles.

The light was automated in 1949, and fell into disrepair, eventually being supplanted by a skeleton tower. In 1988, the lighthouse was removed from Seven Foot Knoll, carried by a 1000 Ton Capacity Shearleg derrick, and placed ashore in Baltimore's Inner Harbor where it was donated to the city. On August 22, 1989 the lighthouse was listed on the National Register of Historic Places. Aided by the Lady Maryland Foundation (now the Living Classrooms Foundation), many members of the Steinhice family descendants worked to restore the structure prior to its re-opening.

The lighthouse is a contributing element in the Baltimore National Heritage Area and part of the Historic American Engineering Record.

Rescues 
Thomas Jefferson Steinhise (Keeper 1930–1941) assisted in the rescue of a tugboat crew in 1933. The tugboat Point Breeze was then owned by the Curtis Towing Company of Baltimore. She was towing a barge of dredge spoils from Baltimore to Gibson Island on August 20, 1933.  The  winds and ) seas had overcome the tug and the crew abandoned ship.  Steinhice took the lighthouse's small motorboat and made his way out in the direction of the tug's distress whistle where he pulled six crew members from the water. Five crew members survived but the engineer perished. Steinhise was awarded the Silver Lifesaving Medal for his actions in saving the lives of the stranded crew. He is buried in Holy Cross Cemetery, Glen Burnie, MD. and his memorial includes a U.S. Lighthouse Service grave-marker.

List of keepers 
A list of Head civilian keepers.

See also 

List of lighthouses in Maryland
List of lighthouses in the United States
Lists of lighthouses and lightvessels
Kerosene Lamp
Position fixing
Port of Baltimore

References

External links 

 Official webpage at Baltimore Maritime Museum

Seven Foot Knoll Lighthouse, from the Chesapeake Chapter of the United States Lighthouse Society
Seven Foot Knoll Lighthouse at lighthousefriends.com

Chesapeake Bay Lighthouse Project – Seven Foot Knoll Light
Seven Foot Knoll Lighthouse 3D Model

, including photo dated 1993, at Maryland Historical Trust

Lighthouses completed in 1855
Inner Harbor, Baltimore
Landmarks in Baltimore
Lighthouses on the National Register of Historic Places in Maryland
National Register of Historic Places in Baltimore
Lighthouses in Baltimore
Baltimore National Heritage Area
Historic American Engineering Record in Maryland